"Make My Love Go" is a song by English singer Jay Sean, and the lead single from his upcoming studio album. It is Jay Sean's first single release in three years. The song features Jamaican singer Sean Paul, who previously collaborated with Jay Sean on the 2010 single "Do You Remember". The song was produced by J-Remy and also features vocals from Kiana Ledé. The single was released on 5 February 2016, by Sony Music.

Background
Sean collaborated with Sean Paul on his second single, "Do You Remember", from his third album overall (and his first studio album in the United States) All or Nothing. The single received positive reviews from critics, and reached number nine on the US Billboard Hot 100 on 9 January 2010, becoming Sean's second most successful single in the US, after his multi-platinum hit, "Down".

It contains a sample of lyrics from Maxi Priest's song "Close to You" (1990).

Release
The single was released worldwide on 5 February 2016.

Music video
The music video for the song featured Jay Sean, Sean Paul and Candice Craig, who has also featured Sean's "All I Want" music video. It was released on 12 February 2016.

Chart performance
The song reached number 16 on the Dutch Top 40 chart and number 24 on the Single Top 100 chart.

The Song reached No.1 on the UK Asian Music Charts. 

The song has reached number 49 on the UK Singles Chart.

Track listing
Digital download
 "Make My Love Go"  – 3:31

iTunes download
 "Make My Love Go"  – 3:41

Credits 

 Jay Sean – lead vocals
 Sean Paul – lead vocals
 Kiana Ledé - background vocals (chorus)

Charts and certifications

Weekly charts

Year-end charts

Certifications

References

2016 singles
Jay Sean songs
Songs written by Jay Sean
Cash Money Records singles
Song recordings produced by Orange Factory Music
2016 songs
Songs written by Sean Paul
Songs written by Louis Bell
Songs written by Gary Benson (musician)